SODA Off-Road Racing is an off-road racing simulation released for both DOS and Windows PCs. The game was based on the SODA series but featured only fantasy vehicles and tracks. The game was developed by Software Allies, a collaboration of companies that included Papyrus.

Reception

The game received "average" reviews according to the review aggregation website GameRankings. GameSpot said, "SODA Off-Road Racing is a great title marred only by poor graphics and uninspired sound."

References

External links
 

1997 video games
DOS games
Off-road racing video games
Papyrus Design Group games
Sierra Entertainment games
Windows games
Multiplayer and single-player video games
Video games developed in the United States